94P/Russell 4 is a periodic comet in the Solar System. It fits the definition of an Encke-type comet with (TJupiter > 3; a < aJupiter). It was discovered by Ken Rusell on photographic plates taken by M. Hawkins on March 7, 1984. In the discovery images, Russell estimated that the comet had an apparent magnitude of 13 and a noticeable tail of 5 arc minutes. In the year of discovery, the comet had come to perihelion in January 1984.

With an aphelion (furthest distance from the Sun) of 4.7 AU, comet 94P currently has an orbit contained completely inside of the orbit of Jupiter.

In July 1995, 94P was estimated to have a radius of about 2.6 km with an absolute magnitude (H) of 15.1. It may have a very elongated nucleus with an axial ratio of a/b >= 3.

References

External links 
 Orbital simulation from JPL (Java) / Horizons Ephemeris
 Elements and Ephemeris for 94P/Russell – Minor Planet Center
 94P/Russell at the Minor Planet Center's Database
 94P at Kazuo Kinoshita's Comets
 Images of 94P/Russell 4 from the 2010 passage

Periodic comets
Encke-type comets
0094
094P
Comets in 2016
19840307